Amplification or Amplified or Amplify may refer to:

Science and technology
 Amplification, the operation of an amplifier, a natural or artificial device intended to make a signal stronger
 Amplification (molecular biology), a mechanism leading to multiple copies of a chromosomal region within a chromosome arm
 Amplify Tablet, Android-based tablet
 Polar amplification, the phenomenon describing how the Arctic is warming faster than any other region in response to global warming
 Polymerase chain reaction (PCR), a molecular biology laboratory method for creating multiple copies of small segments of DNA
 Twitter Amplify, a video advertising product that Twitter launched for media companies and consumer brands
 Amplification of the ground acceleration during an earthquake which is called seismic site effects

Music
 Instrument amplifier, the use of amplifiers in music 
Amplified (band), a Hong Kong rock band 
 Amplified (Q-Tip album)
 Amplified (Mock Orange album)
 Amplified // A Decade of Reinventing the Cello, by Apocalyptica

Other uses
 Amplification (rhetoric), a figure of speech that adds importance to increase its rhetorical effect
 Amplification (psychology), in which physical symptoms are affected by a psychological state
 Amplify (company), a digital education company launched in 2012
 Amplify (distributor), American independent film distributor
 Amplify Dot, rapper and broadcaster from London, England
 Amplified Bible (AMP), English translation of the Bible produced jointly by Zondervan and The Lockman Foundation
 Intelligence amplification, the use of information technology in augmenting human intelligence.

See also
 Amplifier (disambiguation)
 Amp (disambiguation)